Loenen is a former municipality in the province of Utrecht, Netherlands.

Loenen may also refer to:
 Loenen, Apeldoorn, a village in the province of Gelderland, Netherlands

See also
 Loenen-Kronenburg, a former municipality (1817-1819) in the province of North Holland, Netherlands
 Loenen en Wolferen or Overbetuwe, a municipality in the province of Gelderland, Netherlands